Gil Bellows (born June 28, 1967) is a Canadian actor, screenwriter, and director. He is best known for the roles of Tommy Williams in the 1994 movie The Shawshank Redemption, Billy Thomas in the Fox television series Ally McBeal (1997–2002), and CIA agent Matt Callan in the CBS television series The Agency (2001–2003). In 2016–2017, he was a regular cast member in the USA Network series Eyewitness.

Early life
Bellows was born in Vancouver, British Columbia, and attended Magee Secondary School with fellow future actress Carrie-Anne Moss. After graduation, he pursued a career in acting, studying at the American Academy of Dramatic Arts in Los Angeles, California.

Career
Bellows is known for his first motion-picture role as Tommy in The Shawshank Redemption (1994). Also in 1994, he played the lead role Watty Watt in Love and a .45 with Renée Zellweger, Billy Thomas in the television series Ally McBeal, and CIA agent Matt Callan in the television series The Agency. Bellows also appeared in the psychological thriller Chasing Sleep as Detective Derm, opposite star Jeff Daniels. He appeared in The Weather Man as a perverted rehabilitation counsellor. He was in the films Black Day Blue Night, Snow White: A Tale of Terror, as Will, and Un amour de sorcière, a French film, as Michael Firth (1997).
He has appeared on the Hallmark Channel original film Final Days of Planet Earth and the Canadian television series Terminal City.

In 2007, he completed filming for Kill Kill Faster Faster, which is a contemporary film noir inspired by the critically acclaimed novel of the same name by Joel Rose.

Bellows also played a State Department Officer in 24: Redemption, a television film prequel to the seventh season of 24.

He starred in the Super Channel science-fiction adventure thriller film Infected.

Bellows has also appeared as Maxwell Lord on Smallville in the Season 9 episodes "Charade" and "Hostage".

In 2010, Bellows had a recurring role in FlashForward as Timothy, a window-washer who becomes a born-again Christian and evangelist after a near-death experience. Bellows also co-starred in the movie Unthinkable that same year.

He co-starred with Steve Austin and Eric Roberts in the 2010 action film Hunt to Kill, and in 2011 co-starred with Macha Grenon and Julia Stone in The Year Dolly Parton Was My Mom. He starred in the 2012 feature film Fury. In some second-season episodes (2012) of Boss he appeared as a casino investor.

In 2014 Bellows starred with Tricia Helfer in the Syfy miniseries Ascension, a retro space opera / murder mystery about the 600-person crew of the USS Ascension, an Orion-class nuclear pulse propulsion spaceship, on its secret 100-year journey to Proxima Centauri, having been launched in 1963 by President Kennedy. Bellows played Harris Enzmann, the son of the founder of the Ascension project, who oversees its progress from a secret facility on Earth.

On October 16, 2016, Bellows debuted as a cast regular in USA Network's new, 10-episode, straight-to-series police drama, Eyewitness. He plays Gabe Caldwell, a veterinarian and the husband of Sheriff Helen Torrance (series lead Julianne Nicholson). The sheriff is trying to solve what appears to be a random triple-murder in a turkey farmer's home. But as the series begins to unfold, she is unaware that the farmer's teenage son and his male friend—the latter of whom also happens to be Gabe and Helen's foster son; at first, unbeknownst to either parent—had been secretly exploring new feelings for each other just prior to the carnage, witnessed the murders. The killer is still at large, is someone she wouldn't normally suspect, and is determined to permanently silence the witness he saw hiding. Meanwhile, off the clock and at home, Caldwell and Torrance seem to enjoy a genuinely happy marriage. The series, although set in mainly in the Hudson River Valley, was actually filmed in Parry Sound, Ontario, Canada.

In 2019, Bellows guest-starred as the unnamed maternity doctor in season 3, episode 9, of Hulu's The Handmaid's Tale.

Personal life
Gil Bellows is married to American actress Rya Kihlstedt and has two children with her.

Filmography 

 The First Season (1988) as Ronne
 Law & Order (1991, TV series) as Howard Metzler
 Flying Blind (1992, TV series) as Gerard
 Going to Extremes (1993, TV series) as Ben
 The Shawshank Redemption (1994) as Tommy Williams
 Love and a .45 (1994) as Watty Watts
 Miami Rhapsody (1995) as Matt
 Black Day Blue Night (1995) as Hitchhiker Dodge
 Silver Strand (1995, TV movie) as Brian Del Piso
 Radiant City (1996, TV movie) as Bert Kramer
 The Substance of Fire (1996) as Val Chenard
 Witch Way Love (1997) as Michael
 Snow White: A Tale of Terror (1997) as Will
 White Lies (1997) as Punk Guy
 The Assistant (1997) as Frank Alpine
 Dinner at Fred's (1997) as Richard
 Ally McBeal (1997–2002, TV series) as Billy Thomas
 The Practice (1998, TV series) as Billy Thomas
 Judas Kiss (1998) as Lizard Browning
 Say You'll Be Mine (1999) as Mason
 Ally (1999, TV series) as Billy Thomas
 The Courage to Love (2000, TV movie) as Dr. Gerard Gaultier
 Beautiful Joe (2000) as Elton
 Chasing Sleep (2000) as Detective Derm
 Night Visions (2001, TV series) as Keith Miller (segment "Renovation")
Mermaid Chronicles Part 1: She Creature (2001, TV movie) as Miles
 The Agency (2001–2002, TV series) as Matt Callan
 Whitewash: The Clarence Bradley Story (2002, TV movie) as Mike De Guerin
 Second String (2002, TV movie) as Dan Heller
 1st to Die (2003, TV movie) as Chris Raleigh
 Fast Food High (2003) as Dale White
 The Twilight Zone (2003, episode: "Homecoming") as Maj. Rob Malone
 Blind Horizon (2003) as Dr. Theodore Conway
 EMR (2004) as Paramedic
 Karen Sisco (2004, TV series) as Special Agent Donny Pepper
 Zeyda and the Hitman (2004) as Jeff Klein
 Cooking Lessons (2004, TV movie) as Professor Mocha
 How's My Driving (2004, short) as Jimmy
 Childstar (2004) as Isaac
 Pursued (2004) as Ben Keats
 A Bear Named Winnie (2004, TV movie) as Colonel Barret
 Keep Your Distance (2005) as David Dailey
 The Weather Man (2005) as Don
 Terminal City (2005, TV series) as Ari Sampson
 Final Days of Planet Earth (2006, TV movie) as Lloyd Walker
 The Promotion (2008) as Mitch
 Kill Kill Faster Faster (2008) as Joe
 bgFATLdy (2008) as Sam
 The Cleaner (2008, TV series) as Mickey Efros
 Passchendaele (2008) as Royster
 Toronto Stories (2008) as Henry
 Infected (2008, TV movie) as Ben Mosher
 24: Redemption (2008, TV movie) as Frank Tramell
 Happenchance (2010, short) as Stan
 Smallville (2010, TV series) as Maxwell Lord
 FlashForward (2010, TV series) as Timothy
 Unthinkable (2010) as Agent Vincent
 Goblin (2010, TV movie) as Neil Perkins
 A Night for Dying Tigers (2010) as Jake
 Criminal Minds (2010, TV series) as Jeff Joyce
 Hunt to Kill (2010) as Banks
 The Year Dolly Parton Was My Mom (2011) as Phil
 Girl Walks into a Bar (2011) as Emmit
 The Maiden Danced to Death (2011) as Fred
 Trading Christmas (2011, TV movie) as Ray Johnson
 Neighbors (2011) as Vern
 Fury (2012) as Bartender Bill
 True Justice (2010–2012, TV series) as Nikoli Putin
 House at the End of the Street (2012) as Weaver
 Boss (2012, TV series) as Vacarro
 Vegas (2012, TV series) as George Grady
 Mad Ship (2013) as Archie Cameron
 Louis Cyr (2013) as Richard Kyle Fox
 Parkland (2013) as David Powers
 3 Days in Havana (2013) as Jack Petty
 Extraterrestrial (2014) as Sheriff Murphy
 Leading Lady (2014) as Daniel Taylor
 Falling Skies (2014, TV series) as Nick Phillips
 The Calling (2014) as Detective Ray Green
 Kill the Messenger (2014) as DEA Agent Miller
 Bones (2014, TV series) as Mason Barnes
 Ascension (2014, TV Mini-Series) as Harris Enzmann
 Girl on the Edge (2015) as Jake Green
 Patriot (2015–2018, TV series) as Lawrence Lacroix
 Weepah Way for Now (2015) as John
 Life on the Line (2015) as Pok' Chop
 11.22.63 (2016, TV miniseries) as FBI Agent James B. Hosty
 Dead Draw (2016) as Harrison
 She Has a Name (2016) as Alex
 Eyewitness (2016, TV series) as Gabe Caldwell
 Blood Honey (2017) as Marvin Heath
 The Detectives - 'Nine Shots' / The Case That Haunts Me / The Orion Project (2018) as Det. Peter Baker
 Scary Stories to Tell in the Dark (2019) as Chief Turner
 The Handmaid's Tale (2019) as Doctor
 Awake (2021) as Dr. Katz
 Love in the Time of Corona (2020) 
 Women of the Movement (miniseries) (2022) as Gerald Chatham

References

External links

1967 births
Canadian male film actors
Canadian male television actors
Living people
Male actors from Vancouver
American Academy of Dramatic Arts alumni
20th-century Canadian male actors
21st-century Canadian male actors
Primetime Emmy Award winners